Abdul Karim Abdullah al-Arashi (22 July 1929 – 10 June 2006), was a Yemeni politician who served as the President of the Yemen Arab Republic briefly from 24 June to 18 July 1978.  He was preceded by Ahmed Al-Ghashmi and succeeded by Ali Abdullah Saleh. He also served as Vice President of Yemen Arab Republic, from 1978 to 1990, and the Speaker of the Constituent People's Assembly (Parliament) from 1978 to 1988, and the president of the Shura Council from 1988 to 1990.

A statement by the president's office noted that Al-Arashi played an important role in the 1962 Yemeni revolution and in defending its goals. “Throughout the various positions he held, he proved to be steadfast and highly competent,” the statement indicated.

He died on June 10, 2006 in Riyadh, Saudi Arabia aged 71.

Early life 
Born in 1934 in Sana’a city North Yemen, Al-Arashi received his basic education in Sana’a and completed his studies at the Scientific School. He then embarked upon judiciary and administrative work while he was young. After the September 26 revolution, he became more prominent at the political level, as he participated in various military campaigns in defence of the revolution.

Career 
Al-Arashi held numerous prominent positions, being appointed Minister of Finance twice, during which he established the state's first budget. He also was appointed Minister of Local Administration whereupon he reformulated the Local Governance Law.

Following President Ahmed Al-Ghashmi's assassination, He was appointed Chairman of the Presidential Council of the former Yemen Arab Republic (also known as North Yemen) from June 24 to July 18 of 1978. Shortly thereafter, he was elected chairman of the People's Council (Parliament) as well as vice president in the same year.

In 1988, Al-Arashi unanimously was elected Shura Council president. Two years later, namely on the occasion of reunification, he was elected a member of the Presidential Council. In 1997, he was appointed a consultant to the president.

References

External links 
 Arabic Wiki
 Facebook Page

Presidents of North Yemen
Vice presidents of North Yemen
Speakers of North Yemen legislature
2006 deaths
People from Sanaa
1929 births